The Sweden national football team represents the nation of Sweden in international association football. The team is controlled by the Swedish Football Association (SvFF) and competes as a member of the UEFA and the FIFA. The team played its first official international match on 12 July 1908 against Norway, winning 11–3. Since the match against Norway, 1,189 players have made at least one international appearance for the team. Of them, 147 have served as captain of the national team. This list contains footballers who have served as captain of the Sweden national team and is listed according to their number of matches captained.

The Sweden national team's record appearance-maker as captain is Björn Nordqvist, who led the team out 92 times during his 115-cap tenure. He is the only player to have captained Sweden at the three different major tournaments; 1970 FIFA World Cup, 1974 FIFA World Cup and 1978 FIFA World Cup. During the tournament in 1974, Bo Larsson was the first-choice captain, but Nordqvist wore the armband in the last match against Yugoslavia. Zlatan Ibrahimović is the player with second most captaincies. Original a vice captain behind Henrik Larsson, he took over the armband in the summer of 2010 and wore it until his international retirement in 2016. Midfielder Jonas Thern and defender Erik Nilsson are the most successful captains regarding medals. Thern led Sweden to a semi-final in UEFA Euro 1992 and a third place in 1994 FIFA World Cup. Nilsson led Sweden to third places in both 1950 FIFA World Cup and 1952 Summer Olympics. Birger Rosengren became the first and so far only Swedish captain to win a major international competition after leading the team in the 1948 Summer Olympics. Nils Rosén captained Sweden in their first World Cup in 1934 and Nils Liedholm led the team to their best performance in the World Cup, runners-up in 1958.

Captains 
Players are initially listed by number of matches captained, followed by the chronological order of the first captaincy. Only players who started the match as captain are included here, not players that might have been given the armband due to the starting captain being injured, sent off or substituted off.

Statistics correct as of 9 January 2023.

Chronology
This is a chronology list of the first-choice captains in Sweden's tournament games. Matches in FIFA World Cup, UEFA European Championship and Olympic Games are included here.

FIFA World Cup

UEFA European Championship

Olympic Games

Footnotes

References

External links
 Sweden at EU Fotball

Captains
Sweden
Association football player non-biographical articles